Climbing rat may refer to the following rodents:
Anonymomys, the Mindoro tree rat, from the Philippines;
Ototylomys, the big-eared climbing rat, from Central America;
Tylomys (various species), from Mexico to Ecuador.

Animal common name disambiguation pages